Ernest Arthur Edwards (17 February 1892 – after 1931) was an English professional footballer who made 222 appearances in the Football League playing for Birmingham, Newport County and Southend United. He played as a half back.

Edwards was born in Stourbridge, Worcestershire. He began his football career with clubs in and around the Black Country before joining Football League Second Division club Birmingham in April 1913. He made his debut on 3 September 1913, in a 3–2 win at home to Stockport County, the first of a run of games at the start of that season, but played only rarely after that before the First World War put an end to League football. Edwards played as a guest for Newport County in the wartime leagues, and after the war returned to the club where he played more than 100 games in the Third Division South. In the 1927 close season Edwards joined Southend United, where he played nearly 100 games in all competitions, and went on to play for Dudley Town and Merthyr Town before retiring from the game in 1932.

Notes

References

1892 births
Year of death missing
Sportspeople from Stourbridge
English footballers
Association football midfielders
West Bromwich Albion F.C. players
Kidderminster Harriers F.C. players
Redditch United F.C. players
Birmingham City F.C. players
Merthyr Town F.C. players
Newport County A.F.C. players
Southend United F.C. players
English Football League players
Dudley Town F.C. players